Hey! is an album by Julio Iglesias. It was released in 1980 by Columbia Records. In 1981, Iglesias was nominated for a Grammy Award for the album under the Latin Pop Album category.

Track listing

 "Por ella" (For Her)
 "Amantes" (Lovers)
 "Morriñas" (Homesickness)
 "Viejas tradiciones" (Old Traditions)
 "Ron y Coca Cola" (Rum And Coca Cola)
 "Hey (Hey!) 4:58
 "Un sentimental" (I Am Sentimental)
 "Paloma blanca" (White Dove)
 "La nave del olvido" (The Ship of Oblivion)
 "Pajaro Chogüi" (Chogui Bird)

Charts

Weekly charts

Year-end charts

Sales and certifications

See also
 List of best-selling Latin albums
 List of best-selling albums in Spain

References

Bibliography

 

1980 albums
Julio Iglesias albums
Columbia Records albums